Clonakenny Gaelic Athletic Club (Irish: CLG Chluain Uí Chionaoith) is a Tipperary GAA club which is located in County Tipperary, in Ireland. It currently plays hurling (at Senior grade) and Gaelic football (at Junior grade)in the Mid Tipperary Division of Tipperary GAA, but was formerly in the North division. The club is located in the parish of Bournea, between the towns of Roscrea (to the north) and Templemore (to the south).

History
Clonakenny GAA was formed in about 1905, and initially played in the North division. At that time teams were 17 a side. The first Clonakenny team wore a green jersey with a white hoop. About 1910, a political split developed which resulted in some players switching to Moneygall GAA, which in 1915-17 reached three North division finals. Other Clonakenny players fielded for Clonmore GAA in those years. On 25 October 2015 Clonakenny won their 1st county final since 1968 beating Thurles Sarsfield on a scoreline of 2–13 to 3-09

Achievements
 Tipperary Intermediate Hurling Championship: (1) 2015
 Mid Tipperary Intermediate Hurling Championship: (5) 2003, 2010, 2011, 2012, 2013
 Tipperary Junior A Hurling Championship: (1) 1967
 Mid Tipperary Junior A Hurling Championship: (4) 1964, 1967, 2001, 2002
 Mid Tipperary Junior B Hurling Championship: (1) 1995
 Tipperary Junior A Football Championship: (1) 1966
 Mid Tipperary Junior A Football Championship: (1) 1966
 Tipperary Junior B Football Championship: (1) 2015
 Mid Tipperary Junior B Football Championship: (4) 2001, 2005, 2015, 2021
 Tipperary Under-21 C Hurling Championship: (2) 2005, 2007
 Mid Tipperary Under-21 C Hurling Championship: (4) 2001, 2002, 2003, 2004
 Mid Tipperary Under-21 B Football Championship: (3) 2009, 2010, 2012 (with Moneygall)
 Mid Tipperary Under-21 C Football Championship: (2) 2001, 2003
 North Tipperary Minor A Hurling Championship: (1) 2016 (with Moneygall)
 Tipperary Minor B Hurling Championship: (1) 2015 (with Moneygall)
 North Tipperary Minor B Hurling Championship: (1) 2015 (with Moneygall)
 Tipperary Minor C Hurling Championship: (3) 1999, 2005, 2006
 Mid Tipperary Minor C Hurling Championship: (4) 1999, 2001, 2002, 2003
 North Tipperary Minor A Football Championship: (1) 2016 (with Moneygall)
 Tipperary Minor C Football Championship: (1) 2009
 Mid Tipperary Minor C Football Championship: (3) 1999, 2001, 2006
 Mid Tipperary Under 12 D Hurling Championship: (1) 2018
 North Tipperary Feile B Football Championship: (1) 2019 (with Moneygall GAA)
 North Tipperary Under 16 Football Championship: (1) 2019 (with Moneygall GAA)
 North Tipperary Under 21 Football Championship: (1) 2017 (with Moneygall GAA)

Notable players
 Cian O'Dwyer: Played Celtic challenge for Tipperary (2018)
 Oisin O'Dwyer: Played primary game football for Tipperary (2018)
 Diarmuid Ryan: Played minor hurling for Tipperary (2016)
 Cain Russell: Played primary game and under 14 football for Tipperary (2014)
 Pa Ryan: Corner Back on Tipperary Minor Hurling Team (2009)
 Willie Ryan: Wing Back on Tipperary Minor Hurling Team (2009), played Intermediate and Senior hurling as well
 Gearóid Byrne: Played Minor Football and U-21 Hurling for Tipperary
 John Costigan: Played minor, intermediate and senior for the county. Former Chairman of the Tipperary GAA County Board
 Paddy Crampton: Won Minor and Intermediate All-Ireland with Tipperary
 Liam Maher: Scored 17 goals and 11 points for Clonakenny in their 6 Championship outings in 1967 operating at full forward. Played intermediate hurling for Tipperary
 Frank Smith: Played Intermediate hurling, junior football and minor football for the county
 Mick Smith: Former Minister for Defence, played intermediate hurling and minor football for Tipperary
 Willie Smith: Played Senior, minor and is holder of an U-21 All-Ireland medal; won two Fitzgibbon Cup medals with UCD
 Jim Treacy: Played intermediate hurling for Tipperary
 Dan Smith: Played minor football for Tipperary

Gaelic football

Facilities

In 1981 the club purchased a new  playing field in the townland of Corriga, and the new pitch was opened by the then President of the GAA, Paddy Buggy, on 16 September 1984. Previously Clonakenny teams had trained in a parochial field located in Lismacken. The club's own property in Gurteen, a field which had been secured from the Land Commission at the turn of the century, would have required too much investment to develop but its sale helped to fund the purchase and development of a pitch.

In February 1990 it was decided to add dressing rooms. The club now has excellent facilities for players, and the premises are also used by other organisations such as Foróige and Community Games.

The club has since added a third dressing room as well as new showers and a kitchen.

References

External links
Clonakenny GAA Club website

Gaelic football clubs in County Tipperary
Hurling clubs in County Tipperary